Sompur is a village in the Koppal district of Karnataka state, India.

Demographics
Per the 2011 Census of India, Sompur has a total population of 1677; of whom 860 are male and 817 female.

See also
Lakkundi
Halligudi
Kuknoor
Koppal

References

Villages in Koppal district